Eupithecia cretosa is a moth in the family Geometridae. It is found in Tanzania and Kenya.

References

Moths described in 1994
cretosa
Moths of Africa